Excel Entertainment is an Indian production company, founded by Ritesh Sidhwani and Farhan Akhtar in 1999. Based in Mumbai, they mainly produce Hindi films.  In 2017, they released India's first original series for Amazon Prime Video, Inside Edge, which was nominated for the International Emmy Awards for Best Drama Series.

Their debut production, Dil Chahta Hai, received critical acclaim and was a huge rage for the youth, at that time. They won National Film Awards for both Dil Chahta Hai and Rock On!!. With productions such as Don, Zindagi Na Milegi Dobara, Fukrey, Dil Dhadakne Do, and Raees, they are known for presenting unique characters and a contemporary style of cinema. Gully Boy was also India's official entry to the 92nd Academy Awards.

Excel Entertainment also ventured into distribution and distributed the Hindi dubbed versions of the 2018 Indian Kannada-language period action thriller, K.G.F: Chapter 1, and it's sequel, K.G.F: Chapter 2, both starring Yash. They also distributed the 2019 Telugu epic period film, Sye Raa Narasimha Reddy, starring Chiranjeevi.

Films

2001 - 2010
The company’s first production was the critically acclaimed, Dil Chahta Hai (2001), which marked the directorial debut of Farhan Akhtar. The film received a National Award in the category of Best Feature Film Hindi and was also screened at IFFI

 
The company then went on to produce the war-drama, Lakshya (2004). While it was critically acclaimed, it did not fare well at the box-office. Over the years, it has developed a huge cult following and is considered to be one of the greatest coming-of-age films in Hindi cinema. Excel also produced Don (2006), the official remake of Amitabh Bachchan’s Don (1978), which did commercially well, though it received mixed reviews from both the critics and audience, alike. This was followed by Honeymoon Travels Pvt. Ltd. (2007), which marked the directorial debut of Reema Kagti.

They then produced a short film, Positive (2007), directed by Farhan Akhtar. It was a part of the AIDS JaaGo (AIDS Awake) joint initiative of Mira Nair's Mirabai Films and the voluntary organizations, Avahan and Bill & Melinda Gates Foundation.

Excel's next release was Rock On (2008), a musical drama written and directed by Abhishek Kapoor. It opened to overwhelmingly positive reviews from the both the critics and audience, alike. It did well at the box office. It also won the National Film Award for Best Feature Film in Hindi and National Film Award for Best Supporting Actor for Arjun Rampal.

This was followed by Zoya Akhtar’s directorial debut, Luck by Chance (2009). The film was well received by critics, but it did not do well at the box-office. It was followed by Vijay Lalwani’s, psychological thriller, Karthik Calling Karthik (2010), starring Farhan Akhtar, Deepika Padukone, and Ram Kapoor. To indulge and prepare for the role, Farhan isolated himself at home and turned off his cellphone. He also learned to solve the Rubik's Cube, an activity that his character completes in only one try.

2011 - 2015
In 2011, Excel produced the action thriller, Game, directed by Abhinay Deo. It featured a large ensemble cast of Abhishek Bachchan, Kangana Ranaut, Anupam Kher, Boman Irani, and Jimmy Sheirgill. Later that year, Zoya Akhtar's Zindagi Na Milegi Dobara (2011) releasd, becoming a critical and commercial success. It also had an ensemble cast of Hrithik Roshan, Farhan Akhtar, Abhay Deol, Katrina Kaif, and Kalki Koechlin. This was followed by Farhan Akhtar’s second installment in the Don series, Don 2 (2011), starring Shah Rukh Khan, Priyanka Chopra, Boman Irani, and Om Puri.  With a box office gross of over ₹202 Crores,  the film was one of the highest-grossing Indian films of all time and the third highest-grossing Indian film of 2011.
 
Excel's second collaboration with Aamir Khan, Talaash, was their only release in 2012. Along with Aamir Khan, it starred Rani Mukerji, Kareena Kapoor Khan, Nawazuddin Siddiqui, and Shernaz Patel. This was followed by Mrighdeep Singh Lamba’s light comedy, Fukrey (2013), starring Pulkit Samrat, Varun Sharma, Manjot Singh, Ali Fazal, Vishaka Singh, and Richa Chadda. It was a sleeper hit, though it received mixed reviews. It was also re-released in September 2013, owing to public demand.
 
Excel produced the dark humour, Bangistan (2015), starring Riteish Deshmukh and Pulkit Samrat. Later that year, the production house produced the social satire family drama, Dil Dhadakne Do (2015), directed by Zoya Akhtar. Like Zoya's previous films, it had an ensemble cast of Ranveer Singh, Priyanka Chopra, Farhan Akhtar, Anushka Sharma, Rahul Bose, Anil Kapoor, and Shefali Shah. The film grossed  ₹1.45 billion at the box office against a budget of ₹830 million, and earned a number of accolades.

2016 - present
In 2016, Excel produced Nitya Mehra’s rom-com, Baar Baar Dekho (2016), along with Karan Johar's Dharma Productions. It starred Sidharth Malhotra, Katrina Kaif, Ram Kapoor, Sarika Thakur, and Rajit Kapur. They also produced Rock On 2 (2016), starring Farhan Akhtar, Arjun Rampal, Shraddha Kapoor, amongst others. Unlike Rock On!, it was a huge commercial disaster.
 
The company’s first film in 2017 was Rahul Dholakia’s Raees. It featured Shah Rukh Khan, Nawazuddin Siddiqui, Mohammed Zeeshan Ayyub, and Mahira Khan. Though it was commercially successful, it received mixed reviews from both the critics and audience, alike. It was followed by Mrighdeep Singh Lamba’s Fukrey Returns (2017), the sequel to Fukrey. It received mixed-to-negative reviews.
 
In 2018, Excel produced the thriller drama, Three Storeys (2018). It was followed by Reema Kagti’s historical sports drama, Gold (2018), starring Akshay Kumar, Kunal Kapoor, Amit Sadh, Mouni Roy, Vineet Kumar Singh and Sunny Kaushal. The film netted ₹25.25 crores on its opening day, becoming one of the year's biggest opening day releases.

Excel Entertainment then teamed with Anil Thadani and distributed K.G.F:Chapter 1. It received a positive response from the audience, though it received mixed reviews from the critics. On the day of release, collected ₹25 crores worldwide, which was the highest opening in Kannada cinema.
 
2019 saw the release of Zoya Akhtar’s hugely acclaimed Gully Boy, starring Ranveer Singh, Alia Bhatt, Siddhant Chaturvedi, Vijay Varma, and Kalki Koechlin. It won a record 13 Filmfare Awards, including Best Film, Best Director, Best Actor for Ranveer Singh, Best Actress for Alia Bhatt, and Best Supporting Actress for Siddhant Chaturvedi. It became the second film to win all four acting awards. Additionally, the film was India’s official entry for the Academy Awards in 2020, in the Best Foreign Film category. It received positive reviews from critics, with praise directed to Akhtar’s direction, Maurya’s dialogues, and the performances of all the cast.

In October that year, Excel distributed the Hindi-dubbed version of Sye Raa Narasimha Reddy,  starring Mega Star Chiranjeevi and Amitabh Bachchan, which was originally filmed in Telugu. The movie has also been touted as one of the most expensive films to date, with a budget of about ₹ 300 crores.

On 16 July 2021, Rakeysh Omprakash Mehra's sports drama, Toofaan, released directly on Amazon Prime Video. It starred Farhan Akhtar, Paresh Rawal, and Mrunal Thakur. It opened to highly mixed reviews. Bollywood Bubble stated Toofan, literal meaning ‘storm’ lives up to its name in all honestly. It is a film about life and choices.

OTT
In July 2017, Excel pioneered into the OTT sphere with a sports-drama series Inside Edge created by Karan Anshuman starring Vivek Oberoi, Siddhant Chaturvedi, Richa Chadha, Angad Bedi, Tanuj Virwani, Sayani Gupta among others. The series was critically acclaimed for its strong performances and story line. The series was also nominated for the 46th International Emmy Awards in the category for Best Drama Series.

Their second web series was a Crime-Thriller named Mirzapur (2018) created by Karan Anshuman and Puneet Krishna starring Ali Fazal, Vikrant Massey, Pankaj Tripathi, Divyendu Sharma, Shweta Tripathi. The series was well received by audiences, but received mixed to negative reviews from critics. Pankaj Tripathi won the Best-Actor Drama at the iReel Awards for the series.

The TV series Made In Heaven (2019) released in March. The show was created by Zoya Akhtar and Reema Kagti  starring Sobhita Dhulipala, Arjun Mathur, Kalki Koechlin, Jim Sarbh among others. The web-series was appreciated heavily by several critics and multiple positive online reviews. The web-series received an award at the ITA awards for the category Best Series Jury Award and prize for the Best Direction.

A show named Fukrey Boyss (2019)  was launched on Discovery Kids.

December 2019 saw the release of Karan Anshuman’s Inside Edge season 2. The second season invites viewers to look at cricket much beyond just a game and manifested a huge public demand.

On 23 October 2020, season 2 of Mirzapur released on Amazon Prime Video.

The second collaboration of Farhan Akhtar and Rakeysh Omprakash Mehra happened after their first successful film Bhaag Milkha Bhaag. An action sports drama entertainer Toofaan released on July 16, 2021 on Amazon Prime Video starring Farhan Akhtar, Paresh Rawal, Mrunal Thakur. The film was directed by Rakeysh Omprakash Mehra.

Upcoming projects
Phone Bhoot, a horror comedy, is currently slated to release in November 2022. It stars Katrina Kaif, Siddhant Chaturvedi, and Ishaan Khatter in the lead roles, directed by Gurmmeet Singh, of Mirzapur fame.

On 15 February 2021, Yudhra, starring Siddhant Chaturvedi, Malavika Mohanan and Raghav Juyal was announced. The film is being helmed by Ravi Udyawar, of Mom fame. It is slated for a spring 2023 release.

On 11 August 2021, Jee Le Zaraa, starring Priyanka Chopra Jonas, Katrina Kaif and Alia Bhatt was announced. The female-centric road film will be directed by Farhan Akhtar, from a story written by Zoya Akhtar, Reema Kagti, and himself.

Filmography

Series

References

External links
Excel Entertainment

Film production companies based in Mumbai
Indian companies established in 1999
Mass media companies established in 1999
Hindi cinema
1999 establishments in Maharashtra